"1-Luv" is a song by American rapper E-40, and the second single from his second studio album In a Major Way (1995). It features R&B artist Leviti and interpolates "One Love" by Whodini. The song charted at number 71 on the Billboard Hot 100.

Background
A phone call is heard in the beginning of the song. In an interview with Complex, E-40 revealed that it was an actual call, from his cousin Kaveo, who had been telling E-40 about his time in penitentiary. E-40 dedicated the song to "the struggle and all the people that's incarcerated", and used it to explain the hard times in his life.

Charts

References

1995 singles
1995 songs
E-40 songs
Jive Records singles
Songs written by E-40